These are the rosters of all participating teams at the women's water polo tournament at the 2020 Summer Olympics in Tokyo. The ten national teams were required to submit squads of 12 players. Additionally, teams could name one alternate player. In the event that a player on the submitted squad list suffered an injury or illness, that player would be able to be replaced by the player in the alternate list. On 3 July 2021, the International Olympic Committee (IOC) confirmed that there was a change for the 2020 Summer Olympics, allowing all 13 water polo players named to be available on the roster, with 12 being named for each match. This change was implemented due to the challenges of the COVID-19 pandemic. As of 7 August 2021, all players competed in the women's tournament.

As the head coach of the South Africa women's national water polo team, Delaine Mentoor became the first female head coach in the men's and women's Olympic water polo tournaments.

Abbreviations

Group A

Australia

Australia's final squad was announced on 24 May 2021.

Head coach: Predrag Mihailović

Note: Age as of 23 July 2021Source: Australia Women | Tokyo 2020 Olympics

Canada

Canada's final squad was announced on 28 June 2021.

Head coach: David Paradelo

Note: Age as of 23 July 2021Source: Canada Women | Tokyo 2020 Olympics

Netherlands

The Netherlands's final squad was announced on 24 June 2021.

Head coach: Arno Havenga

Note: Age as of 23 July 2021Source: Netherlands Women | Tokyo 2020 Olympics

South Africa

South Africa's squad was announced on 24 June 2021. Daniela Passoni and Kelsey White were replaced by Hannah Calvert and Nicola Macleod.

Head coach: Delaine Mentoor

Note: Age as of 23 July 2021Source: South Africa Women | Tokyo 2020 Olympics

Spain

Spain's final squad was announced on 9 July 2021.

Head coach: Miki Oca

Note: Age as of 23 July 2021Source: Spain Women | Tokyo 2020 Olympics

Group B

China

Head coach:  Petar Porobić

Note: Age as of 23 July 2021Source: China Women | Tokyo 2020 Olympics

Hungary

Hungary's final squad was announced on 29 June 2021.

Head coach: Attila Bíró

Note: Age as of 23 July 2021Source: Hungary Women | Tokyo 2020 Olympics

Japan

Japan's final squad was announced on 19 May 2021.

Head coach: Makihiro Motomiya

Note: Age as of 23 July 2021Source: Japan Women | Tokyo 2020 Olympics

ROC

ROC's final squad was announced on 13 July 2021.

Head coach: Alexandr Gaidukov

Note: Age as of 23 July 2021Source: ROC Women | Tokyo 2020 Olympics

United States

The United States' final squad was announced on 23 June 2021.

Head coach: Adam Krikorian

Note: Age as of 23 July 2021Source: United States Women | Tokyo 2020 Olympics

Team statistics

Average age

Average height

Number of left-handed players

Player statistics

Age records

Coach statistics

Age
Legend
  – Female head coach

See also
 Water polo at the 2020 Summer Olympics – Men's team rosters

References

Sources
 Water Polo – Athlete Profiles | Tokyo 2020 Olympics 
 Water Polo – Olympic Reports | Tokyo 2020 Olympics
 Water Polo – Official Results Book | Tokyo 2020 Olympics (archive)
 Water Polo – Team Rosters | Tokyo 2020 Olympics
 Australia, Canada, China, Hungary, Japan, Netherlands, ROC, South Africa , Spain, United States

External links
 Water Polo – Tokyo 2020 (IOC official website) 
 Tokyo 2020 (FINA official website)

Women's team rosters
2020
Water Polo Women's